David Frank Andrews (born 20 May 1951) is an Australian Christian anarchist author, speaker, social activist, community worker, and a founder of the Waiters' Union, an inner city Christian community network working with Aboriginals, refugees and people with disabilities in Brisbane, Australia. In India at the time of Indira Gandhi's 1984 assassination, he helped protect Sikhs from the backlash through non-violent intervention. Andrews and his wife were forced to leave that year.

Andrew works to advance Christian-Muslim relations, quotes Islamic leaders, and counts many Muslims as colleagues. He released a statement of regret when Maulana Wahiduddin Khan died in Delhi in April 2021 of COVID-19.

Works
 Can You Hear the Heartbeat?: A Challenge to Care the Way Jesus Cared with David Engwicht. London: Hodder & Stoughton, 1989. 
 Building a Better World: Developing Communities of Hope in Troubled Times. Sutherland: Albatross Books, 1996. 
 Christi-Anarchy: Discovering a Radical Spirituality of Compassion. Oxford: Lion Publishing, 1999. Eugene: Wipf & Stock, 2012. 
 Not Religion, But Love: Practising a Radical Spirituality of Compassion. Oxford: Lion Publishing, 2001. Eugene: Wipf & Stock, 2012. 
 Compassionate Community Work: An Introductory Course for Christians. Carlisle: Piquant Editions, 2006. 
 Plan Be: Be the Change You Want to See in the World. Milton Keynes: Authentic Media, 2008. 
 People of Compassion. Melbourne: TEAR, 2008. Eugene: Wipf & Stock, 2012. 
 Hey, Be and See: We Can be the Change We Want to See in the World. Milton Keynes: Authentic Media, 2009. 
 See What I Mean?: See the Change We Can be in the World. Milton Keynes: Authentic Media, 2009. 
 A Divine Society: The Trinity, Community and Society. Brisbane: Frank, 2009. Eugene: Wipf & Stock, 2012. 
 Learnings: Lessons We Are Learning about Living Together. Brisbane: Frank, 2010. Eugene: Wipf & Stock, 2012. 
 Bearings: Getting Our Bearings Again in the Light of the Gospel. Brisbane: Frank, 2010. Eugene: Wipf & Stock, 2012. 
 "Bismillah - Christian-Muslim Ramadan Reflections" Melbourne: Mosaic, 2011 
 Down Under: In-Depth Community Work Melbourne: Mosaic, 2012 
 Out And Out: Way-Out Community Work Melbourne: Mosaic, 2012 
 "Isa- Christian-Muslim Ramadan Reflections" Melbourne: Mosaic, 2013 
 "The Jihad of Jesus - The Sacred Nonviolent Struggle For Justice" Eugene: Wipf and Stock, 2015

References

Further reading

External links
 
 The Waiters' Union website
 Plan Be book website
 Jihad of Jesus book website

1951 births
Living people
Australian anarchists
Australian Christian pacifists
Australian Christian religious leaders
Australian expatriates in India
Australian religious writers
Christian anarchists
English emigrants to Australia
Former members of Evangelical parachurch organizations
Uniting Church in Australia people
Writers from Brisbane